The Roman Catholic Diocese of Hsinchu (Lat: Dioecesis Hsinchuensis) is a diocese of the Latin Church of the  Roman Catholic Church in Taiwan.

Erected as the Diocese of Hsinchu in 1962, the diocese is suffragan to the Archdiocese of Taipei.

The current bishop is John Baptist Lee Keh-mien, appointed in November 2006.

Ordinaries
Petrus Pao-Zin Tou † (21 Mar 1961 Appointed - 29 Jun 1983 Resigned) 
Lucas Liu Hsien-tang (29 Jun 1983 Succeeded - 4 Dec 2004 Retired) 
James Liu Tan-kuei (4 Dec 2004 Appointed - 30 May 2005 Resigned) 
John Baptist Lee Keh-mien (6 Apr 2006 Appointed - )

See also

 Catholic Church in Taiwan

Hsinchu
Roman Catholic dioceses and prelatures established in the 20th century
Christian organizations established in 1962
1962 establishments in Taiwan
Hsinchu